Before I Kill You, Mr. Bond is a card game designed by James Ernest and published by Cheapass Games.   Players take the roles of supervillains in a spy movie, capturing superspies (including "Mr. Bond") and taunting them.  Other players can foil the taunts by playing another taunt with a letter that corresponds to the first taunt.  If this happens, the superspy escapes and destroys the fortress of the player attempting to kill him.

In 2000, following a cease and desist order from Metro-Goldwyn-Mayer, the game was taken out of print. It was reissued in 2004 as James Ernest's Totally Renamed Spy Game with a 110-card deck, double the size of the deck in the original game.

In October 2015, Cheapass Games announced via Kickstarter that they would be releasing a new version of the game, titled Before I Kill You, Mister Spy. It was released in 2016 and returned to the original 55-card deck size of the original game.

Reviews
Pyramid

References

Card games introduced in 1996
Cheapass Games games
Dedicated deck card games
James Bond games